The West Indian National Party was a political party in Trinidad and Tobago. It was originally founded on 18 November 1942 as a progressive party, aligned with the socialist views of trade unionists Rupert Gittens and Quintin O'Connor. One of the key planks of their platform was the nationalisation of major industries.

Following the breakup of the Democratic Labour Party in 1974, the party was resurrected by Ashford Sinanan to contest the 1976 general elections. One of three parties to succeed the DLP, it received just 1,242 votes and failed to win a seat. It did not contest any further elections.

References

Defunct political parties in Trinidad and Tobago
Political parties established in 1942
1942 establishments in Trinidad and Tobago